During the 2006–07 English football season, Preston North End F.C. competed in the Football League Championship.

Season summary
The 2006–07 season started well under Simpson, seeing Preston rise to the top of the Championship in December, the highest league place the team has reached in 55 years. Despite much interest in striker David Nugent, Simpson was able to hold on to the player throughout the January transfer window. On 28 March, Nugent went on to get his full international debut for England, and even managed to score his first international goal in the 90th minute of the match against Andorra.  This was the first time a Preston player received a full international cap for England since Tom Finney. It was around this time that Preston went into a decline, which in the end meant the team missing out on a playoff spot in the final few weeks of the season.

Final league table

Results
Preston North End's score comes first

Legend

Football League Championship

FA Cup

League Cup

Squad

Left club during season

Transfers

In
  Sean St Ledger –  Peterborough United, £225,000
  Liam Chilvers –  Colchester United, free
  Neil Mellor –  Liverpool
  Michael Ricketts –  Southend United, free
  Pavel Pergl –  Sparta Prague, free
  Seyfo Soley –  Genk, free
  Wayne Henderson –  Brighton & Hove Albion, £200,000

Out
  Tyrone Mears –  West Ham United, £1,000,000
  Mark Jackson –  Southport, free
  Alan McCormack –  Southend United, free
  Brian Stock –  Doncaster Rovers, £150,000
  Andy Smith –  Bristol City, free
  Danny Dichio –  Toronto FC, free

References

2006–07
Preston North End